Princess Heungbang was a Goryeo Royal Princess as the youngest daughter of King Taejo and Queen Sinmyeong, also the younger sister-in-law of King Gyeongsun of Silla who later married her half brother, Prince Wonjang and had a son and a daughter who would become King Gyeongjong's 5th wife. From her title, Heungbang became the first Korean Princess who held title Gung-ju (궁주, 宮主) which later commonly used during the Goryeo periods.

References

Goryeo princesses
Year of birth unknown
Year of death unknown